Burgess was a British title used in the medieval and early modern period to designate someone of the Burgher class. It originally meant a freeman of a borough or burgh but later coming to mean an official of a municipality or a representative in the House of Commons.

Usage in England 
In England, burgess meant an elected or unelected official of a municipality, or the representative of a borough in the English House of Commons. This usage of "burgess" has since disappeared. Burgesses as freemen had the sole right to vote in municipal or parliamentary elections. However, these political privileges in Britain were removed by the Reform Act in 1832.

Usage in Scotland 
Burgesses were originally freeman inhabitants of a city where they owned land and who contributed to the running of the town and its taxation.  The title of burgess was later restricted to merchants and craftsmen, so that only burgesses could enjoy the privileges of trading or practising a craft in the city through belonging to a Guild (by holding a Guild Ticket) or were able to own companies trading in their guild's craft. One example are the Burgess of Edinburgh.

The burgesses' ancient exclusive trading rights through their Guilds were abolished in 1846.  Thereafter a burgess became a title which gave social standing to the office and usually carried with it a role which involved charitable activities of their guild or livery company, as it does today.

Usage in American colonies 
The term was also used in some of the American colonies. In the Colony of Virginia, a "burgess" was a member of the legislative body, which was termed the "House of Burgesses".

Etymology 
It was derived in Middle English and Middle Scots from the Old French word burgeis, simply meaning "an inhabitant of a town" (cf. burgeis or burges respectively). The Old French word burgeis is derived from bourg, meaning a market town or medieval village, itself derived from Late Latin burgus, meaning "fortress" or "wall". In effect, the reference was to the north-west European medieval and renaissance merchant class which tended to set up their storefronts along the outside of the city wall, where traffic through the gates was an advantage and safety in event of an attack was easily accessible. The right to seek shelter within a burg was known as the right of burgess.

The term was close in meaning to the Germanic term burgher, a formally defined class in medieval German cities (Middle Dutch burgher, Dutch burger and German Bürger). It is also linguistically close to the French term bourgeois, which evolved from burgeis.

"Greensleeves" reference 

The original version of the well-known English folk song "Greensleeves" includes the following:

Thy purse and eke thy gay guilt knives,
thy pincase gallant to the eye:
No better wore the Burgesse wives,
and yet thou wouldst not love me.

This clearly implies that at the time when it was composed (late 16th to early 17th century) a burgess was proverbial as being able to provide his wife with beautiful and expensive clothes.

See also
 Burgher (title)
 Bourgeois
 Citizen
 Bourgeois of Brussels
 Poorter
 House of Burgesses of Virginia, the first elected legislative assembly in the New World
 Borough and Burg
 "The Taill of the Uponlandis Mous and the Burges Mous", a poem from Scotland which partly satirised the class.
 Burgage

References

External links 
 

Titles
Estates (social groups)
Medieval titles
Bourgeoisie